Igor Viktorovich Kaleshin (3 October 1952 – 14 October 2019) was a Russian professional football coach and a player.

His sons Vitali and Yevgeni Kaleshin and nephew Igor are all professional footballers.

External links
 

1952 births
2019 deaths
Soviet footballers
FC Akhmat Grozny players
FC CSKA Kyiv players
FC Kuban Krasnodar players
Soviet football managers
Russian football managers
FC Kuban Krasnodar managers
Russian Premier League managers
Association football midfielders